The 2017–18 Furman Paladins men's basketball team represented Furman University during the 2017–18 NCAA Division I men's basketball season. The Paladins, led by first-year head coach Bob Richey, played their home games at Timmons Arena in Greenville, South Carolina as members of the Southern Conference. They finished the season 23–10, 13–5 in SoCon play to finish in third place. They defeated Western Carolina in the quarterfinals of the SoCon tournament before losing in the semifinals to East Tennessee State. Despite having 23 wins, they did not participate in a postseason tournament.

Previous season
The Paladins finished the 2016–17 season 23–12, 14–4 in SoCon play to finish in a three-way tie for the SoCon regular season championship. They lost to Samford in the quarterfinals SoCon tournament. They were invited to the CollegeInsider.com Tournament where they defeated USC Upstate and Campbell before losing in the semifinals to Saint Peter's.

On March 26, 2017, head coach Niko Medved resigned to become the head coach at Drake. He finished at Furman with a four-year record of 62–70. Assistant coach Bob Richey was named the interim head coach for the CIT semifinal, and was named full-time head coach on April 10.

Roster

Schedule and results

|-
!colspan=9 style=| Non-conference regular season

|-
!colspan=9 style=| SoCon regular season

|-
!colspan=9 style=| SoCon tournament

References

Furman Paladins men's basketball seasons
Furman
Furm
Furm